Syzygium glenum, known as a satinash, is a rainforest plant of tropical Queensland, Australia. Found in tropical Queensland in Australia. Usually a small tree, it may reach 10 metres tall.

References

glenum
Myrtales of Australia
Flora of Queensland
Trees of Australia
Taxa named by Bernard Hyland